Eastern High School is an English medium co-educational, community school in the Rumney area of Cardiff, Wales.The school serves the communities of Rumney, Llanrumney, Trowbridge and St Mellons on the eastern side of Cardiff. It opened in September 2014 on site of the old Rumney High School. It moved to its new home at the Eastern Community Campus on Trowbridge Road in January 2018.

References

Educational institutions established in 2014
Secondary schools in Cardiff
2014 establishments in Wales